Payne H. Midyette Sr. (1898–1983) was an American insurance broker, politician and rancher in Tallahassee, Florida. He served one term in the Florida House of Representatives (1945–1947) and established an insurance agency in the tallest building in Tallahassee. Midyette Road in Tallahassee is named for him. With Frank D. Moor as partner, they established in 1931 the insurance firm Midyette-Moor Inc.

He served in Europe with 32nd Infantry Division during World War I.

References

1898 births
1983 deaths
Democratic Party members of the Florida House of Representatives
American ranchers
American businesspeople in insurance
People from Tallahassee, Florida
Military personnel from Florida
20th-century American businesspeople
United States Army personnel of World War I
20th-century American politicians